The Easter Council was a church council held at Rome by Pope Urban II on Easter Day, 1099. St Anselm, then in exile from his see at Canterbury, was in attendance. Among other acts, it strengthened the Catholic Church's opposition to lay investiture and the paying of homage by bishops.

See also
 Council of Rome (AD 382)

References

11th-century church councils
Catholic Church councils held in Italy